Gerin is 445 km (313 mile) wide impact crater on Saturn's moon Iapetus, located on Saragossa Terra. It is partially obscured by the larger crater, Engelier, whose formation has destroyed about half of Gerin. Gerin is located at

Nomenclature 
Crater Gerin is named after one of the Twelve Peers in the French epic Song of Roland; this name was approved by the International Astronomical Union in 2008.

See also 

 List of geological features on Iapetus

References 

Impact craters on Saturn's moons
Surface features of Iapetus (moon)